United Nations Security Council Resolution 2040 was unanimously adopted on 12 March 2012.

Content 
The resolution amends a provision related to the enforcement of the arms embargo; extends and modifies the mandate of a slimmed-down Panel of Experts.

See also 
List of United Nations Security Council Resolutions 2001 to 2100

References

External links
Text of the Resolution at undocs.org

2012 United Nations Security Council resolutions
United Nations Security Council resolutions concerning Libya
2012 in Libya
March 2012 events